The 2010 season of competitive association football in Malaysia.

Promotion and relegation

Pre season

New and withdrawn teams

New teams 
  Sime Darby (FAM League)
  KL SPA (FAM League)

Withdrawn teams 
  Kuala Muda Naza (Super League)
  UPB-Myteam (Super League)
  Proton (Premier League)
  Penjara (FAM League)

National Team

Malaysia national football team

2011 AFC Asian Cup qualification 

Note: Previous matches are held in 2009

2010 AFF Championship

Group stage

Semi-final 
First Leg

Second Leg

Malaysia won 2–0 on aggregate.

Final 
First Leg

Second Leg

Malaysia won 4–2 on aggregate.

International Friendlies

Malaysia national under-23 football team

2010 Asian Games

Group stage

1/8 final 

Source:

Eximbank Cup/Thang Long Cup (Ho Chi Minh City) 2010

Group stage

League season

Super League

Premier League

FAM League

Domestic Cups

Charity shield

FA Cup

Final 

Negeri Sembilan win 5–4 on penalties'''

Malaysia Cup

Final

Malaysian clubs in Asia

Selangor FA

Group stage

References